Chaubi Gahi Shikohabad is a village and Gram panchayat in Bilhaur Tehsil, Kanpur Nagar district, Uttar Pradesh, India. It is located 60 KM away from Kanpur City.

References

Villages in Kanpur Nagar district